Bolen may refer to:

Bolen (surname)
Boleń, Lesser Poland Voivodeship, village in Poland
Boleń, Lubusz Voivodeship, village in Poland
Bolen, Georgia, a community in the United States
Bolen Building, in Hindman, Kentucky, United States, listed on the National Register of Historic Places
Roti bolen, an Indonesian bread